The 2012 McCoy's Premier League Darts was a darts tournament organised by the Professional Darts Corporation; the eighth edition of the tournament. The event began at the Manchester Arena in Manchester on 9 February, and ended at The O2 Arena in London on 17 May.

The format was a double round robin tournament with the top 4 finishers moving on to the play-offs. Each league match was played best of 14 legs. If a player won his eighth leg before the 14th leg, no further legs were played after this point. Two points were awarded for a win and one point awarded for a draw.

Phil Taylor won his sixth and final Premier League title by defeating Simon Whitlock 10–7 in the final. The two men who contested the final were also the players to throw nine-dart finishes during the tournament. Taylor's came in week 2 against Kevin Painter and Whitlock threw his during his semi-final win against Andy Hamilton.

The 2012 Premier League final between Phil Taylor and Simon Whitlock, which took place on 17 May 2012, was the last darts match that Sid Waddell commentated on before his death of bowel cancer on 11 August 2012.

Qualification 
The PDC's top four players following the Ladbrokes.com World Darts Championship on 3 January qualified by right to compete in the Premier League Darts 2012, and were joined by four wild card selections. Two being chosen by the PDC and two being chosen by broadcasters Sky Sports. The line-up was confirmed on 3 January 2012. Andy Hamilton and Kevin Painter made their debut Premier League appearances as wildcard entries.

WC = Wild Card

Venues
Fifteen venues were used for the 2012 Premier League, with the only change being Dublin becoming the first venue from outside the United Kingdom to host a night of the Premier League.

Prize money
The prize money was increased to £450,000 from £410,000 in 2011, but the highest checkout bonus was withdrawn, and the third place play-off was removed as well.

Results

League stage
The fixtures were announced on 16 January 2012.

9 February – week 1
 MEN Arena, Manchester

16 February – week 2
 AECC, Aberdeen

23 February – week 3
 Odyssey Arena, Belfast

1 March – Week 4
 Westpoint Arena, Exeter

8 March – Week 5
 Brighton Centre, Brighton

15 March – Week 6
 SECC, Glasgow

22 March – Week 7
 The O2, Dublin

29 March – Week 8
 Cardiff International Arena, Cardiff

5 April – Week 9
 Capital FM Arena, Nottingham

12 April – week 10
 Motorpoint Arena, Sheffield

19 April – week 11
 Bournemouth International Centre, Bournemouth

26 April – week 12
 Echo Arena, Liverpool

3 May – week 13
 National Indoor Arena, Birmingham

10 May – week 14
 Metro Radio Arena, Newcastle upon Tyne

Play-offs – 17 May
 The O2 Arena, London

Table and streaks

Table

{| class="wikitable sortable" style="text-align:center;"
|-
! style="width:20px;" abbr="Position"|Pos
!width=200 |Name
! style="width:20px;" abbr="Played"|Pld
! style="width:20px;" abbr="Won"|W
! style="width:20px;" abbr="Drawn"|D
! style="width:20px;" abbr="Lost"|L
! style="width:20px;" abbr="Points"|Pts
! style="width:20px;" abbr="Legs For"|LF
! style="width:20px;" abbr="Legs Against"|LA
! style="width:20px;" abbr="Leg Difference"|+/-
! style="width:20px;" abbr="Legs Won Against Throw"|LWAT
! style="width:20px;" abbr="Tons"|100+
! style="width:20px;" abbr="Ton Plus"|140+
! style="width:20px;" abbr="Maximums"|180s
! style="width:20px;" abbr="Average"|A 
! style="width:20px;" abbr="High Checkout"|HC
|- bgcolor=#ccffcc
!1
|align=left| || 14 || 11 || 2 || 1 ||24|| 107 || 56 || +51 ||  ||  ||  ||  ||  || 147
|- bgcolor=#ccffcc
!2
|align=left|   RU|| 14 || 7 || 2 || 5 ||16|| 84 || 85 || –1 ||  ||  ||  ||  ||  || 164 
|- bgcolor=#ccffcc
!3
|align=left|  
 || 14 || 4 || 5 || 5 ||13|| 89 || 89 || 0 ||  ||  ||  ||  ||  || 152 
|- style="border-bottom:3px solid green;" bgcolor=#ccffcc
!4
|align=left|   || 14 || 5 || 3 || 6 ||13|| 83 || 89 || –6 ||  ||  ||  ||  ||  || 154 
|- bgcolor=#ffcccc
!5
|align=left|  || 14 || 4 || 5 || 5 ||13|| 86 || 97 || −11 ||  ||  ||  ||  ||  || 170 
|- bgcolor=#ffcccc
!6
|align=left|   || 14 || 4 || 4 || 6 ||12|| 83 || 91 || –8 ||  ||  ||  ||  ||  || 170
|- bgcolor=#ffcccc
!7
|align=left|   || 14 || 5 || 1 || 8 ||11|| 80 || 92 || –12 ||  ||  ||  ||  ||  || 157
|- bgcolor=#ffcccc
!8
|align=left|   || 14 || 3 || 4 || 7 ||10|| 79 || 92 || –13 ||  ||  ||  ||  ||  || 161

Top four qualified for the Play-offs after Week 14.
NB: LWAT = Legs Won Against Throw. 
A = Average
HC = High checkout.
Players separated by +/- leg difference if tied. If leg difference is equal the table is sorted by the player's LWAT.

Streaks

Player statistics
The following statistics are for the league stage only. Playoffs are not included.

Phil Taylor
Longest unbeaten run: 10
Most consecutive wins: 9
Most consecutive draws: 1
Most consecutive losses: 1
Longest without a win: 1
Biggest victory: 8–1 (v. Gary Anderson and v. James Wade)
Biggest defeat: 5–8 (v. Adrian Lewis)

Simon Whitlock
Longest unbeaten run: 3
Most consecutive wins: 3
Most consecutive draws: 1
Most consecutive losses: 2
Longest without a win: 2
Biggest victory: 8–2 (v. Gary Anderson)
Biggest defeat: 0–8 (v. James Wade)

Andy Hamilton
Longest unbeaten run: 5
Most consecutive wins: 2
Most consecutive draws: 3
Most consecutive losses: 3
Longest without a win: 6
Biggest victory: 8–1 (v. Kevin Painter)
Biggest defeat: 2–8 (v. Gary Anderson)

James Wade
Longest unbeaten run: 3
Most consecutive wins: 3
Most consecutive draws: 2
Most consecutive losses: 3
Longest without a win: 4
Biggest victory: 8–0 (v. Simon Whitlock)
Biggest defeat: 1–8 (v. Phil Taylor)

Raymond van Barneveld
Longest unbeaten run: 3
Most consecutive wins: 2
Most consecutive draws: 3
Most consecutive losses: 2
Longest without a win: 5
Biggest victory: 8–5 (v. Gary Anderson and v. Kevin Painter)
Biggest defeat: 2–8 (v. Adrian Lewis)

Adrian Lewis
Longest unbeaten run: 4
Most consecutive wins: 3
Most consecutive draws: 3
Most consecutive losses: 3
Longest without a win: 6
Biggest victory: 8–2 (v. Raymond van Barneveld)
Biggest defeat: 1–8 (v. Gary Anderson)

Kevin Painter
Longest unbeaten run: 3
Most consecutive wins: 1
Most consecutive draws: 1
Most consecutive losses: 5
Longest without a win: 5
Biggest victory: 8–3 (v. Simon Whitlock and v. Adrian Lewis)
Biggest defeat: 1–8 (v. Andy Hamilton)

Gary Anderson
Longest unbeaten run: 3
Most consecutive wins: 3
Most consecutive draws: 3
Most consecutive losses: 5
Longest without a win: 10
Biggest victory: 8–1 (v. Adrian Lewis)
Biggest defeat: 1–8 (v. Phil Taylor)

Charity single 
The 2012 Premier League Darts players teamed up with the singer Chas Hodges and his band to record a charity single written by Chas called "Got My Tickets for the Darts". The video features Chas, his band, the 2012 Premier League Darts players and walk-on girl Jacqui Adams. The song was released exclusively on iTunes on Friday 18 May, the night after the play-offs at the O2 in London, where it was premiered. Proceeds from the single was donated to the Haven House Children's Hospice.

References

External links 
 

Premier League Darts
Premier League
Premier League Darts